Erode Sengunthar Engineering College is an autonomous, 
private engineering college in Thudupathi, 5 km from Perundurai, 22 km from Erode, Tamil Nadu, India. It is affiliated with Anna University.

Inception
The college was started by Erode sengunthar educational trust in 1996. It has ISO 9001:2008 certification and is accredited by the National Board of Accreditation. It is affiliated to Anna University, Chennai. All the undergraduate courses offered are permanently affiliated to Anna University, Chennai. The college is a Autonomous College, accredited with the National Assessment and Accreditation Council (NAAC) Bengaluru with grade of 'A'.

Departments and courses

Department of Computer Science and Engineering
 B.E. Computer Science and Engineering (four years)
 M.E. Computer Science and Engineering (two years)
 M.Tech. Computer Science and Engineering (five years)

Department of Mechanical Engineering
 B.E. Mechanical Engineering (four years)
 B.E. Mechanical Engineering, Tamil Medium (four years) 
 M.E. Manufacturing Engineering (two years)

Department of Electrical and Electronics Engineering
 B.E. Electrical and Electronics Engineering (four years)
 M.E. Power Electronics and Drives (two years)

Department of Electronics and Communication Engineering
 B.E. Electronics and Communication Engineering (four years)
 M.E. Applied Electronics

Department of Electronics and Instrumentation Engineering
 B.E. Electronics and Instrumentation Engineering (four years)

Department of Civil Engineering
 B.E. Civil Engineering
 M.E. Environmental Engineering

Department of Chemical Engineering
 B.Tech. Chemical Engineering (four years)
 M.Tech. Chemical Engineering (two years)

Department of Information Technology
 B.Tech. Information Technology (four years)

Department of Bio Medical Engineering
 B.E. Bio Medical Engineering (four years)

Department of Artificial Intelligence and Data Science Engineering 
 B.Tech. Artificial Intelligence and Data Science (four years)

Department of Robotics and Automation Engineering 
 B.E. Robotics and Automation Engineering (four years)

Department of Business Administration
 MBA (Master of Business Administration)

Department of Computer Applications
 MCA (Master of Computer Applications) (two years)

Department of Science and Humanities
 Started in 1996.

Facilities

Library
The college has a central library with 45, 934 volumes, 11, 531 titles, 111 Indian periodicals and 107 international periodicals AICTE consortium online journals 656. The library has a collection of more than 3,096 CDs and DVDs Books for the preparation of competitive exams like GATE, TOEFL, GRE, GMAT, Defense Service and Civil Service are in reference and issue sections.

NPTEL (National Programme on Technology Enhanced Learning)

NPTEL provides E-learning through online and video courses in Engineering, Science and Humanities streams. The mission of NPTEL is to enhance the quality of engineering education in the country.

A center for a national programme on Technology-Enhanced Learning functions in the college. In this center, students and faculty members benefit from the video lectures given by eminent professors from IITs on engineering subjects.

Physical education
 Multi-purpose standard 400 meters mud track with field measurements
 Multi-station gym: 12 stations
 Volleyball courts with flood lights and gallery
 Table tennis boards
 Cricket ground
 Basketball, concrete court
 Ball badminton court
 Handball court
 Football field
 Hockey field

Hostel
There are in-campus hostels for boys and girls: two each for boys girls.

Professional societies
There are programmes on Public Awareness, National Integration, Career development, Science Exhibitions.

The institution is an institutional member in the following professional societies:
 Institute of Electrical and Electronics Engineers
 Indian Society for Technical Education Staff Chapter
 Indian Society for Technical Education Student Chapter
 Computer Society of India
 Indian Institution of Production Engineers
Institution of Engineers (India)
Indian Green Building Council
Indian Institute of Chemical Engineers  (IIChE) students’ chapter
Instrument Society of India (ISoI) students’ chapter
Indian Concrete Institute students’ chapter

References

External links
 official site

Engineering colleges in Tamil Nadu
Universities and colleges in Erode district
Colleges affiliated to Anna University
Education in Erode
Educational institutions established in 1996
1996 establishments in Tamil Nadu